Upsolve is a nonprofit online web application that enables low-income Americans to file for Chapter 7 bankruptcy on their own.

History 

Upsolve received seed funding from Y Combinator, the Legal Services Corporation, the Robin Hood Foundation, Harvard University, and former Google CEO Eric Schmidt.

Upsolve was inspired by the Financial Distress Research Project, launched by Professors Jim Greiner (Harvard Law School), Dalié Jiménez (University of California, Irvine School of Law), and Lois Lupica (University of Maine Law School) to study the effectiveness of self-help material in assisting low-income Americans through their legal problems. In 2016, Upsolve spun out of the Access to Justice Lab at Harvard Law School.

Upsolve began by serving low-income residents of New York City before expanding to the rest of the United States.

Process 

Users take an online screener to see if they qualify for assistance from Upsolve. If they qualify, users then answer a series of questions on the Upsolve web application about their financial situation. When users finish answering questions, Upsolve's application populates the bankruptcy forms.

After the paperwork review is finished, users print and deliver their completed bankruptcy paperwork to the court on their own. Upsolve is free for end users.

In 2020, TIME named Upsolve to its annual 100 best inventions of the year list. In 2018, the American Bar Association Journal named Upsolve a top web tool.

References 

Non-profit organizations based in New York City
Legal aid in the United States